At some point in 1826, Joseph Hemphill (J) of  resigned from Congress.  A special election was held to fill the resulting vacancy.

Election results

Kittera took his seat at the start of the Second Session of Congress.

See also
List of special elections to the United States House of Representatives

References

Pennsylvania 1826 02
Pennsylvania 1826 02
1826 02
Pennsylvania 02
United States House of Representatives 02
United States House of Representatives 1826 02